Peter Lund (born 24 February 1955) is a British bobsledder. He competed in the two man event at the 1984 Winter Olympics.

References

External links
 

1955 births
Living people
British male bobsledders
Olympic bobsledders of Great Britain
Bobsledders at the 1984 Winter Olympics
Sportspeople from Lusaka